Matthew James Gourley is an American actor, comedian, and podcaster best known for his work on the Superego and Conan O'Brien Needs a Friend podcasts and Drunk History.

Early life 
Matthew James Gourley was born in Whittier, California to his mother Welford. He grew up near Richard Nixon's childhood home.

Career

Theater and improv 
Gourley graduated from California State University, Long Beach with a bachelor's degree in technical theater and an MFA in performance.

Gourley has acted in, directed, and worked on the technical side of productions in the Los Angeles area since the early 1990s, including as Curly in Of Mice and Men, Antipholus in The Comedy of Errors, Dogberry's henchman in Much Ado About Nothing, Orville in The Doctor In Spite of Himself, Hal in Loot, Brindsley in Black Comedy, the director of Tooth and Nail at the Little Fish Theatre, and as a set/lighting designer on The Complete Works of William Shakespeare (abridged). Gourley did video work and set design for multiple productions of Fellowship!.

Gourley began performing with ComedySportz in Los Angeles during elementary school. He met Jeremy Carter at a ComedySportz tournament in San Jose in the mid-90s. He spent years as an actor and improviser at various Disney theme parks along with Carter and Mark McConville, among others. Gourley has also performed at Second City, ImprovOlympic, and the Upright Citizens Brigade Theatre.

Teaching 
Gourley has taught theater and improvisation at Riverside City College, Long Beach City College, and College of the Canyons. He has also led workshops on Shakespearean improv at the Fracas! Improv Festival.

Television 
Gourley and Carter were founding contributors to Channel 101, producing and starring in the "retro futuristic action spectacular" Ultraforce. Ultraforce lasted three episodes and also featured Derek Mears, Jeff B. Davis, and Chris Tallman.

In 2013, Gourley sold a pilot titled Wunderland that he wrote with his then-girlfriend and now-wife, Amanda Lund, to Fox. The series was a workplace comedy loosely based upon the time Gourley and Lund spent working as actors at Disney theme parks, though it did not end up getting produced. This pilot can be heard recorded on the Dead Pilot's Society Podcast's 3rd episode. Gourley has appeared on Community, HarmonQuest, Ghost Ghirls, and Drunk History, as well as doing voice work for Adventure Time.

Commercials 
Gourley's best known commercial work is his position as a spokesperson for Volkswagen in 2014 and 2015. He has also appeared in ads for McDonald's, Carlton Draught, Lowe's, Hewlett-Packard, Hyundai, Xbox, Late Night with Conan O'Brien, and Budweiser.

Podcasts 
In 2006, Gourley and Carter launched Superego, an improvisational podcast they conceived of on Christmas Eve 2005 based on the conceit of clinical case studies. Superego has since added Mark McConville, Jeff Crocker, and Paul F. Tompkins as regular cast members.

In September 2013, Gourley started hosting a podcast along with Matt Mira titled James Bonding on the Nerdist network, later acquired by the Earwolf podcast network. The podcast discusses the James Bond films one by one with guests. In November 2014, Gourley helped launch the new Wolfpop podcast network, a sister to Earwolf, along with Paul Scheer and Adam Sachs. As part of this launch, Gourley himself began a new podcast titled I Was There Too which focuses on the actors and stories behind the most classic scenes from film and television. Gourley also co-hosted The Andy Daly Podcast Pilot Project on Earwolf with Andy Daly.

Gourley co-hosted Pistol Shrimps Radio with his Superego colleague Mark McConville. The podcast consisted of unedited commentary of the games of The Pistol Shrimps, a women's rec league basketball team in Los Angeles.

In addition to hosting his own shows, Gourley has guested on numerous podcasts over the years, including Never Not Funny, Comedy Bang! Bang!, Thrilling Adventure Hour, and Spontaneanation. In addition to editing Superego, Gourley has also edited Judge John Hodgman and The Sound of Young America.

In 2018, he started hosting In Voorhees We Trust With Gourley and Rust with Paul Rust, a podcast series reviewing every Friday The 13th film in the franchise.  

Gourley has served as a producer and co-host on Conan O'Brien's podcast Conan O'Brien Needs a Friend since it debuted in November 2018.

In January 2023 Gourley debuted the first episode of Mallwalkin with co-host Mark McMconville. Each episode the co-hosts walk a local mall and comment on retail offerings while recording impromptu interviews with business owners and avoiding audio recording policy violations. 

Gourley is a singer, guitarist, and songwriter. He composed the theme for I Was There Too with James Bladon. He has released a solo album titled Garanimal Farm, recorded tracks with his band named Townland, and released an album with The Journeymen titled Mount Us More.

Gourley is the creator of "The Gourley Method", coined by Paul Rust on an episode of With Gourley And Rust. This is a method of reviewing listicles between two or more people in which the participants will only talk about an entry if when both participants have mentioned the entry in their respective listicles. Gourley previously used "The Gourley Method" on James Bonding.

Personal life 
In 1997, Gourley won a contest to see who could best imitate the sound of a flushing toilet.

Gourley lives in Pasadena with his wife, Amanda Lund. In August 2021, Gourley announced on his Instagram that the couple was expecting a daughter in September of that year.

Filmography

Television

Film

Podcasts 

Other appearances:
Star Wars Minute
Comedy Film Nerds
Earwolf Challenge
Accept the Mystery
Cracked
Podcast: The Ride
Jordan Jesse Go
Feral Audio
Before You Were Funny
Succotash
Feliz Navipod
The Biggest Mistake
Film Junk
Doug Loves Movies
The Big Ones
Newcomers

References

External links
 
 
 
 
 
 
 Matt Gourley on Vine

1973 births
Living people
People from Whittier, California
California State University, Long Beach alumni
American male television actors
American male comedians
American podcasters
Male actors from California
21st-century American male actors
Long Beach City College faculty
College of the Canyons
Comedians from California
21st-century American comedians